Juan José de Bonilla y Herdocia (October 21, 1790 – September 2, 1847) was a Costa Rican politician.

Costa Rican politicians
1790 births
1847 deaths